Pseudalus salmonaceus is a moth in the subfamily Arctiinae. It was described by Rothschild in 1909. It is found in Peru, French Guiana, Venezuela and Ecuador.

References

Moths described in 1909
Arctiini